Yaoi Press is an independent yaoi comic publisher based in Nevada. Founded in 2004 by publisher Yamila Abraham, the company specializes in Global BL, or yaoi comics originally published outside of Asia. Yaoi Press publishes original OEL manga as well as European yaoi in translation, and features both single volume comics and comic series. As of 2020, Yaoi Press had fifty titles on the market. One of Yaoi Press's early publishing strategies in order to improve the reputation of OEL manga among yaoi fans was to headhunt famous artists of Global BL.  In October 2007, Yaoi Press launched a comic book line in order to provide a less expensive option for customers.

Yaoi Press held a fan convention from the 20th to 22nd in 2008 called Yaoi Jamboree, in Phoenix, Arizona. Various manga artists who had previously worked for the company were invited as guests and an art book of submissions by attended were distributed at the convention.

In late 2017, Yaoi Press launched a visual novel spin-off of their company which produces "Yaoi, Bara, and Otome Visual Novels".

Graphic novels

 Punishment
 Royal Pain
 Kingdom of Selfish Love
 Winter Demon
 Surge
 PINNED!
 Exorcisms and Pogo Sticks
 Yaoi Hentai
 The Aluria Chronicles
 Saihôshi the Guardian
 Desire of the Gods
 Spirit Marked
 Enslaved by the Dragon
 Prisoner of the Immortal
 Zesty!
 IDOL
 Wishing for the Moon
 Yaoi: An Anthology of Boys Love
 Stallion
 Treasure
 Dark Prince
 Cain
 The Lily and the Rose
 ANIMA
 Happy Yaoi Yum Yum
 Bastard King (sequel of Dark Prince)

Comic books
 Yaoi Candy
 Offered to a Demon

Art books
 Reflections: The Artwork of KOSEN
 Dark Dreams: A Dany&Dany Yaoi Art Book
 Yaoi Gothic: An Explicit Sketchbook

Visual novels
 My Magical Demon Lover
 To Trust an Incubus
 Cannibal Lottery
 Morningdew Farms
 Gods of Love
 Mister Versatile
 Alpha Hole Prison

Artists
 Studio Kôsen
 le Perrugine
 M.A Sambre
 Studio Kosaru
 Dany&Dany
 Yamila Abraham
 Yishan Li
 Laura Carboni

References

External links
  Yaoi Press'  Official Website 
  Yaoi Press'  Online Store
  Yaoi Press'  Anime Convention
 Arrant, Chris (June 6, 2006) Home-Grown Boys' Love from Yaoi Press Publishers Weekly
 Lees, Sharon. "Yaoi Press: Yaoi Publishers Interviews Part 1". Akiba Angels. July 2006.
 Avila, K. "Yaoi Press: Publisher of Original English-language Yaoi". Jade Magazine. September 2005.
 Beautiful Androgyny "Interview - Yamila Abraham". July 2009.

Companies based in Paradise, Nevada
Comic book publishing companies of the United States
Visual novels
Yaoi